"No Quiero Estar Sin Ti" is a song by the Colombian recording artist Naëla. It was the first single from her first studio album, Naëla (2011). Written by Naëla and produced by Naëla, "No Quiero Estar Sin Ti" was released on February 16, 2010. The song received generally favorable reviews from critics, who praised its composition and gave her a lot of success.

References

External links 
 "No Quiero Estar Sin Ti" - Official music video

Naëla songs
2010 singles
2009 songs